Robbert Arris Jules "Rob" Agerbeek (born 28 September 1937 in Batavia (Jakarta)) is an Indo Dutch boogie-woogie and jazz pianist and winner of several jazz concourses in the Netherlands in the late 1950s. He is regarded as one of Europe's finest jazz pianists, covering the full spectrum of jazz styles from his early days of Boogie-woogie to Chicago traditional Jazz, swing and contemporary jazz.

Early life and career 
In 1954 Rob Agerbeek and his family arrived in the Netherlands. He started playing the piano at the age of 17 or 18. Except for one piano lesson from his mother he is completely self-taught; he learned the piano by listening to records of Albert Ammons, Johnny Maddox, Winifred Atwell, Pete Johnson and Meade Lux Lewis. In the first years of his career Agerbeek is mainly into Boogie-woogie and later in his career he expands his playing styles with bebop, hardbop and dixieland. He accompanied more than hundred, mainly American, Jazz musicians such as Ben Webster, Hank Mobley, Dexter Gordon, George Coleman, Johnny Griffin and Gene Ammons.
Rob Agerbeek performed at international jazzfestivals as the Paris Jazz Festival, Hammerveld Jazz Festival, North Sea Jazz Festival, Kongsberg Jazz Festival and the Berlin Jazz Festival.

Later career 
On 17 November 1996 Agerbeek celebrated his 40 years jubilee as an allround jazz pianist when he was presented with the membership of honour of the Hague Jazz Club.

Rob Agerbeek still occasionally performs with his trio consisting of himself on piano and Ben Schröder on drums and Alex Milo on bass. Joining in on vocals on several performances are Jazz singer Mirjam van Dam, Susanne de Rooij and Brigitte Soffner.

Awards 
 AVRO Jazzcompetitie, winner as Het Rob Agerbeek Kwartet (1956)
 Haags Jazzconcours, winner as Het Rob Agerbeek Kwartet (1958)
 Nationaal Jazzconcours, winner as Het Rob Agerbeek Kwartet (1958)
 Membership of honour, the Hague Jazz Club (1996)

Discography 
Rob Agerbeek's discography of over 40 albums include a double LP with Dexter Gordon live at the Haagse Jazz Club, five CDs with the Dutch Swing College Band and 10 recordings with his own bands of which three on the Oldie Blues label.

 Boogie Woogie Party, as Rob Agerbeek Quintet, CBS, 1971
 Homerun, as Rob Agerbeek Quintet, Polydor, 1971
 Beatles' Boogies, as Rob Agerbeek, CBS, 1971
 All Souls, as The Rob Agerbeek Trio featuring Dexter Gordon, Dexterity, 1972
 Keep the Change, as The Rob Agerbeek Quintet, Munich, 1975
 The Boogie Rocks, as Rob Agerbeek, Oldie Blues, 1975
 Gibraltar, as Harry Verbeke/Rob Agerbeek Quartet, Timeless, 1980
 Miss Dee, as Rob Agerbeek Trio, Lime Tree, 1981
 Seven Steps, as Harry Verbeke/Rob Agerbeek Quartet, Timeless, 1983
 Swing Gift, as Rob Agerbeek Trio, Jazzz '91, 1991
 Second Opinion, as Rob Agerbeek Trio, Jazzz '91, 1992
 Stardust, as Harry Verbeke/Rob Agerbeek, Timeless, 1992
 Full House, as Rob Agerbeek Trio, Nuts Ziektekosten Verzekering, 1994
 The Boogie Rocks, as Rob Agerbeek, Oldie Blues, 1997 (expanded re-issue of 1975 album)
 Boogie on the Move as The Grand Piano Boogie Train: Jaap Dekker, Rob Hoeke and Rob Agerbeek, Rodero Records, 1997
 Blues & Boogie Movin' On as The Grand Piano Boogie Train: Jaap Dekker, Rob Hoeke and Rob Agerbeek, Rodero Records, 1997
 Three of a Kind, as Rob Agerbeek, Oldie Blues, 1998
 That's all, as Ann Burton & Mark Murphy meet the Rob Agerbeek Trio, Blue Jack Jazz Records, 2004
 Pardon My Bop, as Rob Agerbeek/Ruud Brink Quartet, Blue Jack Jazz Records, 2004
 Homerun – volume 2''', as Rob Agerbeek Quintet, Blue Jack Jazz Records, 2006
 The Very Thought of You, as Rob Agerbeek Trio, Venus, 2007 (Japan)
 Almost Blue, as John Marshall & The Rob Agerbeek Trio, Blue Jack Jazz Records, 2008
 On Green Dolphin Street'', as George Coleman and The Rob Agerbeek Trio, Blue Jack Jazz Records, 2010

References

External links 
 Rob Agerbeek at Muziek Encyclopedie
 Rob Agerbeek at Discogs
 Rob Agerbeek at Muziekweb
 Rob Agerbeek at Rate Your Music

1937 births
Living people
Boogie-woogie pianists
Boogie-woogie musicians
Dutch jazz pianists
Dutch jazz composers
Polydor Records artists
Timeless Records artists
Venus Records artists
Dutch people of Indonesian descent
Indo people
Oldie Blues artists
People from Batavia, Dutch East Indies
21st-century pianists
Dutch Swing College Band members